Eru Potaka-Dewes (1939 in Ruatoria – 7 August 2009 in Rotorua) was a New Zealand actor, Māori religious leader and activist.

Life and career 
Eru Potaka-Dewes attended Waiomatatini Native Primary School, Gisborne Boys' High School, and Otago University, where he studied history and teaching. Afterwards he became an Anglican priest.

After living a few years in Australia, he returned to New Zealand in the 1980s and engaged in political and legal debates concerning Maori questions, particularly those related to the Treaty of Waitangi.

During 1991, Potaka-Dewes established the Aotearoa-NZ Action Committee's Alternative Immigration Office (ANZAC) as an immigration centre for indigenous peoples.

During the 1990s and early 2000s (decade), he also was working as an actor, appearing in Jane Campion's film The Piano and Rapa-Nui, produced by Kevin Costner.

He was the dean of theology at the Maori Anglican Theological College in Rotorua and taught in several Auckland and Rotorua schools.

Potaka-Dewes died on 7 August 2009 in Rotorua, aged 70. He was survived by his wife, Kiri, and his children.

Filmography 
 1993: The Piano
 1993: The Rainbow Warrior
 1994: Rapa-Nui
 1999: What Becomes of the Broken Hearted?
 2000: Jubilee
 2002: The Maori Merchant of Venice

External links 
 
 Eru Potaka-Dewes at ihug.co.nz

References 

1939 births
2009 deaths
New Zealand male film actors
New Zealand male Māori actors
New Zealand Māori activists
New Zealand theologians
Ngāti Porou people
New Zealand Anglican priests
University of Otago alumni
People from Ruatoria
New Zealand activists
People educated at Gisborne Boys' High School